Taedia marmorata is a species of plant bug in the family Miridae. It is found in Central America and North America.

References

Further reading

 

Articles created by Qbugbot
Insects described in 1894
Taedia